The 1961 All-Ireland Senior Football Championship was the 75th staging of All-Ireland Senior Football Championship, the Gaelic Athletic Association's premier inter-county Gaelic football tournament. 
The championship began on 30 April 1961 and ended on 24 September 1961.

Kilkenny return to the Leinster championship for the first time since 1944. The Leinster final in Portlaoise was the last to date not played at Croke Park. 

Down won their second All-Ireland in a row.

Results

Connacht Senior Football Championship

Leinster Senior Football Championship

Munster Senior Football Championship

Ulster Senior Football Championship

All-Ireland Senior Football Championship

Championship statistics

Scorers
Overall

Single game

Miscellaneous

 The Kildare-Kilkenny game was the first Leinster championship game Kilkenny played since 1944 as they decided to rejoin it.
 The Leinster final between Offaly vs Dublin was the last Leinster final to date not played at Croke Park, Dublin when it was held at O'Moore Park, Portlaoise with the attendance of 26,826.
 The All Ireland semi-final Offaly vs Roscommon was their first championship meeting.
 Offaly reach their first All Ireland final but were beaten narrowly by Down won it for the second year in a row also were the last team to win a triple of Ulster titles until Armagh (2004–2006).

References